is a passenger railway station  located in the town of Yazu, Yazu District, Tottori Prefecture, Japan. It is operated by the third sector company Wakasa Railway.

Lines
Only local trains stop at this station.

Station layout
The station consists of one ground-level side platform serving a single bi-directional track. The wooden station building is integrated with a beauty shop, and ticket sales are outsourced to the same shop, and the owner of the beauty shop also serves as the station manager. This station building and platform were built in 1930 and were registered as Tangible Cultural Property in 2008.

Adjacent stations

|-
!colspan=5|Wakasa Railway

History
Tampi Station opened on December 1, 1930.

Passenger statistics
In fiscal 2018, the station was used by an average of 102 passengers daily.

Surrounding area
Yazu Town Hall Hatto Government Building
Yazu Municipal Hatto Junior High School
Yazu Town Tanpi Elementary School

See also
List of railway stations in Japan

References

External links 

Railway stations in Tottori Prefecture
Railway stations in Japan opened in 1930
Yazu, Tottori
Registered Tangible Cultural Properties